Tryphon rutilator  is a species of the family Ichneumonidae, subfamily Tryphoninae.

Distribution and habitat
This European-Siberian species is present in most of Europe and Siberia, in the Near East, and in the Oriental realm. These insects mainly inhabit hedge rows.

Description
Head is weakly compressed posteriorly, witt long yellowish antennae consisting of 29-35 segments. Frons has a weak longitudinal carina. These ichneumonids have a black body and reddish abdomen. Legs are mainly yellow-reddish, with black femurs and tibiae on posterior legs.

Biology
Adults can be found from June to July. They mainly feed on nectar of Apiaceae species (especially Anthriscus sylvestris and Heracleum sphondylium).

References

External links 
 
 

Ichneumonidae genera
Insects described in 1761
Taxa named by Carl Linnaeus